Moonbabies may refer to:

Moonbabies (band), a Swedish band
MoonBabies, a 2002 album by Planet X